Transit-proximate development is a term used by some planning officials to describe (potentially dense) development that is physically near a public transport node (e.g. a bus station, train station or metro station).  This type of development includes transit-oriented development, but, according to some planning officials, can also describe development that is not transit-oriented development.  Thus, transit-proximate development can include results where, despite the location of dense development near transit, the development does not take full advantage of -- or fully encourage the use of -- the public transport node.  For example, transit-proximate development could include buildings with extensive parking facilities typical of suburban locations, a lack of "mixed-use development" (housing, workplaces and shopping in the same place), or a lack of extensive pedestrian facilities that would make it easier for people to reach the public transport node.

See also
 New Urbanism
 Smart growth
 Urban sprawl
 Transit-oriented development
 Principles of Intelligent Urbanism
 Transit village
 Streetcar suburb
 Value capture

References 
 use of "transit-proximate" in a government planning document
 "transit-proximate development" distinguished from "transit-oriented development" in Congressional testimony

Public transport
Urban planning